Saimbeyli, alternatively known as Hadjin, is a township and a district in the Adana Province, Turkey. The township is located at the Taurus mountains of Cilicia region, 157 km north of the city of Adana. The district a population of 14,764 as December 2019.

Saimbeyli is on the Göksu river (one of the sources of the Seyhan, in a valley between the forested mountains of Dibek and Bakır. There is a pass through the mountains from here to Kayseri and the valley is watered by many mountain streams.

History and Monuments
The area probably has the foundations of Hittite settlements.  There is no evidence at present that it was occupied in the Roman period, but it seems likely.

The fortress of Saimbeyli may be the medieval Badimon or perhaps the castle of Berdus, which appears on the Coronation List of King Levon I of Cilician Armenia in A.D. 1198/99.  This fortress, which guards the strategic road between Kayseri to the north and the Rubenid castle of Vahka to the south, stands on an outcrop at the junction of two valleys and two tributaries of the Seyhan River. The plan and masonry of Saimbeyli’s castle are identical to the military architecture in the Armenian Kingdom of Cilicia and undoubtedly date from the mid-12th century to the 13th century. Two large round towers with embrasured loopholes (shooting ports) guard the entrance at the northwest, while the remainder of the circuit is protected by steep cliffs below and three rounded salients. In the lower level of the salient in the east wall is the apse for a chapel.  A well-preserved vaulted cistern is located near the southwest side of the ward.  The exterior masonry consists of ashlar blocks with a rusticated facing.  There is evidence of repair, perhaps into early modern times.

Opposite and below the fortress are the substantial remains of ecclesiastical and civilian architecture, which date from the 14th through the 19th century.  The monastic complex dedicated to St. James is perched on the side of a tall hill at the northwest end of the village. The monastery may have a 12th century foundation, but it was rebuilt in 1554 by Bishop Khatchadour.  In 1981 the foundation of an orphanage school was visible and only the east end of the large Church of St. James was standing.  There was evidence of an underground crypt below the central apse of the church.

Population
At the beginning of the 20th century, Hadjin had an Armenian population of around 30,000. The Armenians had six churches, including the main Armenian Apostolic denomination, but also an Armenian Catholic and two Evangelical Armenian churches. The population worked in agriculture and various trades. They were subject to deportations and massacres during the Armenian genocide. After the end of World War I, in 1919, part of the Armenian population returned under the French Protectorate, but the French abandoned the city to Turkish rule, resulting in the Armenian rebellion and the eventual emptying of the city with the arrival of the Kemalist forces. The remaining Armenian population of Hadjin settled in various countries, notably Lebanon, Syria, France, the United States and Latin American countries. They established unions highlighting their city and achievements of its populations.

The Turkish authorities renamed the city Saimbeyli in the name of the Turkish military commander that retook the city under Turkish control.

In 1953, a town called Nor Hachn (New Hadjin) was founded in the Armenian Soviet Socialist Republic (now the Republic of Armenia) in memory of the city of Hadjin in Turkey. According to a census of 2015, Nor Hachn has a population of 9,400, The town also includes in its population some survivors and descendants of survivors of the genocide and a memorial built in memory of the Armenian victims of Hadjin and the Hadjin resistance. The memorial itself was inaugurated in 1974.

Places of interest
Near the village of Bahçeköyü there is a castle perched on a rock.  
Saimbeyli castle (known as Badimon in the Middle Ages)

See also
   an illustrated report on the area from the local governor's office – in Turkish
 Municipality of Saimbeyli
 Ecotourism in Saimbeyli
 Carefully documented photographic survey and plan of the fortress and church at Hadjin / Saimbeyli

References

External links
 Ecotourism in Saimbeyli

 
Cities in Turkey
Populated places in Adana Province
Districts of Adana Province